Dorchester Bay is an arm of the Foxe Basin in the Qikiqtaaluk Region of Nunavut, Canada. It is located on the northern coast of Foxe Peninsula, in western Baffin Island. Its western entrance point is Cape Willoughby.

The bay is used by Inuit for seal hunting.

References

Bays of Foxe Basin